The Chang Feng, or Long Wind is a turbojet powered land-attack cruise missile, indigenously developed by China.  It is the first domestically produced Chinese land-attack cruise missile, and it is the first land-attack cruise missile to enter service with the People's Liberation Army.  There are two variants the Chang Feng 1 and the Chang Feng 2.

History
In the 1970s, the United States concluded that cruise missiles are a very cost effective means of achieving strategic dominance.  The development and deployment cost of 3,000 cruise missiles would be 8.358 billion dollars , plus an additional 10 billion dollars to modify 170 Boeing B-52s to carry the missile.  By comparison, the Soviet Union would have to expend a disproportionate amount of resources to protect itself from the threat produced by such a project.  Such a project would require dozens of Airborne Early Warning and Control aircraft over a thousand interceptors, and over a thousand SA-10 or SA-12 Surface-to-air missile sites, at a cost of almost a trillion US dollars.

Facing a similar strategic choice, China was impressed with the cost-effectiveness of the cruise missile, and conducted its own study in 1979, based on the American study.  Though the exact information from the Chinese study has been classified since the completion of the research, China did release the result, which was that the cost effectiveness of land attack missiles is nine-to-one .  Based on the results of this study, the state-owned Sanjiang Space Estate began development of an indigenous cruise missile, which became the Chang Feng 1.

Chang Feng 1
In 1993, the Chang Feng 1 entered series production and Chinese service .  Several years later, the existence of CF-1 was revealed to Chinese public when two Chinese magazines, Aerospace China and Aerospace World reported its development, and the second magazine further revealed the name Chang Feng (长风), meaning Long Wind, for the first time to the Chinese public .  Following the results of the Gulf War, the Chinese military decided to modify the existing Chang Feng 1 missiles for a precision strike role.

Specifications (estimated):
 Range: ≈ 400 km
 Cruising altitude: < 100 meter
 Speed: high subsonic
 Warhead: nuclear (10 kt TNT equivalent) or conventional
 Propulsion: turbojet
 CEP: better than 20 meter
 Status: production completed, superseded by CF-2
 Service: 1993 to present

Chang Feng 2
Work on the Chang Feng 2 began shortly after the Chang Feng 1's entry into service.  As with the first version, the Chang Feng 2 began as a private venture by the developer itself, Sanjiang Space Estate.  The Chang Feng 2 obtained Chinese governmental support faster than the first version due to strong support by the military command.

On February 24, 1995, the first engine test of CF-2 ended in failure, and it was only after extensive modification when success was finally reached, when the first flight test of an unarmed missile was successfully completed in late August 1996.  On October 6, 1997, the second stage of flight test begun and the result was very successful at the beginning when the first missile was fired.  However, more than a dozen days later, the second test flight resulted in failure.  It would take another half a year before all the problems were stamped out and CF-2 was finally ready for the service, which it eventually did in the late spring or early summer of 1998, and the leaders of CSSG were personally interviewed and praised by Liu Huaqing, the chairman of the Central Military Commission (People's Republic of China) and Chinese defense minister Chi Haotian for the success of CF-2.

According to the April 2000 issue of Chinese magazine Aerospace World (世界航空航天博览) quoting from test results, CF-2 is considered by the Chinese military as one of the most successful of its kind in Chinese inventory, including having the best relative cost, shortest developmental time, most successful upgrade within the past decade, and was accurate enough to be used in surgical strikes.  The guidance system of CF-2 was used to upgrade that of CF-1 so that CF-1 could achieve the same level of accuracy, a top priority of the follow-up improvement program for CF-1.  However, CF series of land attack cruise missiles suffer from their inherit problem of being too large and too heavy that they can only be deployed via land-based platforms, and thus do not appear to have more places in the Chinese military in the future in comparison to later Chinese land attack cruise missiles such as HN series and DH-10.

Specifications (estimated):
 Range: ≈ 800 km
 Cruising altitude: 40 to 100 meter
 Speed: high subsonic
 Warhead: nuclear (10 kt TNT equivalent) or conventional
 Propulsion: turbojet
 CEP: better than 20 meter
 Status: production completed, supplemented and maybe superseded by HN series
 Service: 1998 to present

User
 China: People's Liberation Army Ground Force

References
 Changfeng & Hongniao missiles
 CF & HN missiles
 Aerospace China
 Aerospace World

Guided missiles of the People's Republic of China
Cruise missiles of the People's Republic of China
Weapons of the People's Republic of China
Nuclear cruise missiles of the People's Republic of China